Shahmaran ('Fire snake'), is a mythical creature, half woman and half snake, found with different variations in the folklore of Iran, the Armenian Highlands, Iraq, Turks, and Kurds.

The name Shahmaran comes from the Persian words Shah (شاه), which is a title used for Persian kings, and maran (ماران) “snakes” (singular مار mar): so the name Shahmaran means “the king of Snakes”.

Mythology
Shahmaran is a mythical creature, half snake and half woman, the first human she encounters is a young man named Camasb (also known as Yada Jamsab, Jamisav, Jamasp in other versions of the story). Camasb gets stuck in a cave after he tries to steal honey with a few friends, his friends leave him alone in the cave. He decides to explore the cave and finds a passage to a chamber that looks like a mystical and beautiful garden with thousands of off-white colored snakes and the Shahmaran living together harmoniously. At this point Shahmaran and Camasb fall in love and live in the cave chamber, and the Shahmaran teaches him about medicines and medicinal herbs. Camasb misses living above ground and wants to leave, he tells the Shahmaran he will not share the secret of her living there. Many years pass.

The king of the town of Tarsus becomes ill and the vizier discovers the treatment of his condition requires the Shahmaran flesh. Camasb tells the towns people where Shahmaran lives, according to the legend Shahmaran says, “blanch me in an earthen dish, give my extract to the vizier, and feed my flesh to the sultan.” They bring her to the town and kill her in a bath called, "Şahmaran Hamam". The king eats her flesh and lives, the vizier drinks the extract and dies. Camasb drinks the water of Shahmaran and becomes a doctor, by gaining the Shahmaran's wisdom.

Due to its antiquity, there are many variations of the same story.

Popular culture
In Turkey, Shahmaran is believed to live in the Mediterranean town of Tarsus and a similar legend is told in the Mardin region, a town with a large Kurdish and Arab population. In eastern Turkey, the tale of Shahmaran is still popular, where the population of the country is roughly 15% – 20% Kurdish. In these regions her legend is commonly evoked, with her image depicted in embroidery, fabrics, rugs, and jewelry. The story and imagery of Shahmaran are considered a national treasure in Turkey. 

Many of the versions of the story of Shahmaran are found in fictional books including the J.C. Mardrus translation of The Thousand Nights and One Night as the story of "Jemlia - the Sultan of Underground" and The Ring of Shah Maran, A Story from the Mountains of Turkey. The 1944 fairy tale book called The Ring of Shah Maran, A Story from the Mountains of Kurdistan by Raphael Emmanuel tells the folk story of a boy that shares bread with animals and earns the respect of Shahmaran.

Dutch singer of Iranian descent, Sevdaliza, included a song titled "Shahmaran" on her debut studio album ISON.

Since c. 2016, LGBTQ supporters in Turkey and locations in the Middle East have been using the image of Shahmaran as symbol of supporting LGBTQ issues. Shahmaran's image has also been used to symbolize the strength of Kurdish women by artists Zehra Doğan and Canan Senol. In 2020, the Mardin Metropolitan Municipality in Turkey hosted a public art exhibition, Shahmaran Mardin, featuring Shahmaran statues artist by Ayla Turan, that were decorated by local artists and businesses.

The 2023 Netflix series Shahmaran is also built around the legend in a modern setting.

Historical references 
The Shah Maran–Daulatabad basin is an ancient irrigation system from the Iron Age, found in the 1960s and 1970s near Tepe Yahya in southwestern Iran.

In Adana in southern Turkey, the Yılankale (Snake Castle) is locally known as the home of Shahmaran.

Shahmeran Hamam a historical hammam (Turkish bath) in Tarsus, Turkey, associated with Shahmaran.

See also

 List of dragons in mythology and folklore
Serpent symbolism

Mythological dragons, serpents, and snakes 
Illuyanka – serpentine dragon from Hittite mythology and religion
Nāga – half-human half-snake being, found in Hindu mythology and Buddhist mythology.
Verechelen – mythical creature between a dragon and a snake, often depicted with multiple heads, originating from Volga Bulgaria.
Zahhak – an evil serpent creature, originating in Persian mythology and folklore.
Zilant – mythical creature between a dragon and a wyvern, originating in Kazan.

References

Arabian legendary creatures
Iraqi culture
Persian legendary creatures
Turkish folklore
Turkic legendary creatures
Legendary serpents
Female legendary creatures
Kurdish mythology
Kurdish folklore
Persian words and phrases